George William Molyneux (28 October 1751 – 27 July 1806) was an Irish politician.

Early life
Molyneux was born on 28 October 1751. He was the second son of Sir Capel Molyneux, 3rd Baronet and the former Elizabeth East. He was a brother of Sir Capel Molyneux 4th Baronet, Anne ( Molyneux) Brabazon (wife of Sir Anthony Brabazon, 1st Baronet), and Harriet ( Molyneux) Arabin (mother of William St Julien Arabin). After his mother's death in 1757, his father married Elizabeth, a daughter of Lt. Gen. John Adlercron, formerly Commander-in-Chief, India. From that marriage, he had two younger half-brothers, Thomas (who succeeded as the 5th Baronet) and John Molyneux of the Royal Navy.

His paternal grandparents were Sir Thomas Molyneux, 1st Baronet and his second wife Catherine Howard (a daughter of Professor Ralph Howard of Trinity College). His maternal grandfather was William East of Hall Place, Berkshire, and his uncle was Sir William East, 1st Baronet.

Career
Molyneux was called to the bar in 1750. From 1783 to 1790, Molyneux served as a Member of Parliament for Granard.

Personal life
In 1776, Molyneux married Catherine Gore, a daughter of Richard Gore, Esq. Together, they were the parents of one daughter:

 Charlotte Molyneux, who predeceased him.

Molyneux died at his house at Sutton, near Dublin, on 27 July 1806.

References

External links

1751 births
1806 deaths
Younger sons of baronets
Irish MPs 1783–1790
Members of the Parliament of Ireland (pre-1801) for County Carlow constituencies